Eduardo Bravo Ávila (born 18 February 1991) is a Mexican professional footballer who plays as a goalkeeper.

References

1991 births
Living people
Mexican footballers
Association football goalkeepers
Potros UAEM footballers
Atlante F.C. footballers
Ascenso MX players
Liga Premier de México players
Tercera División de México players
Footballers from Guadalajara, Jalisco